Commerce Tower is a 30-story skyscraper located in Downtown Kansas City, Missouri, USA. Constructed in 1965, it is the ninth-tallest habitable structure in the Kansas City Metropolitan Area, and since the completion of the City Hall, it was the first locally designed Skyscraper in Kansas City. The building was designed by architects Keene & Simpson & Murphy, who moved their offices into the building after it was completed. The facade is constructed of pre-cast stone and glass, (known as a "curtain-wall") creating a unique look, especially for its time. When it opened, its top two floors were home to the Top of the Tower restaurant, which served five varieties of ethnic cuisine in separate dining areas decorated to match the food served there.

The last 15-foot beam was signed by 18,000 people including Harry S Truman.

Commerce Tower is no longer occupied by its namesake, Commerce Bancshares. Commerce Bank moved its headquarters to 1000 Walnut Street in 1985. It is also home to the downtown campus of Park University. The building is expected to change ownership in 2013 and be redeveloped into a $90 million mix of office, residential, and educational uses—due, in part, to construction of the KC Streetcar right outside the building's main entrance.

References

Kansas City, Missouri; An Architectural History, 1826–1990. (Copyright 1992). George Ehrlich. Retrieved August 14, 2007. (Page 141)
American Institute of Architects Guide to Kansas City Architecture & Public Art. (Copyright 2000). American Institute of Architects/KC. Retrieved August 14, 2007. (Page 26, Number 35)

Skyscraper office buildings in Kansas City, Missouri

Office buildings completed in 1965
Downtown Kansas City